Bernardo Enzo Long Baccino (born September 27, 1989 in Colonia, Uruguay) is an Uruguayan footballer.

References

 Profile at BDFA 
 

1989 births
Living people
Uruguayan footballers
Uruguayan expatriate footballers
Rampla Juniors players
S.D. Quito footballers
Expatriate footballers in Ecuador
Association football goalkeepers